The 1985–86 UAB Blazers men's basketball team represented the University of Alabama at Birmingham as a member of the Sun Belt Conference during the 1985–86 NCAA Division I men's basketball season. This was head coach Gene Bartow's 8th season at UAB, and the Blazers played their home games at BJCC Coliseum. They finished the season 25–11, 9–5 in Sun Belt play and lost in the championship game of the Sun Belt tournament. They received an at-large bid to the NCAA tournament as No. 6 seed in the West region. The Blazers defeated Missouri in the opening round before falling to No. 3 seed North Carolina in the round of 32, 77–59.

Roster

Schedule and results

|-
!colspan=9 style=| Regular season

|-
!colspan=9 style=| Sun Belt tournament

|-
!colspan=9 style=| NCAA tournament

Rankings

NBA Draft

References

UAB Blazers men's basketball seasons
UAB
UAB